Dymocks Booksellers is an Australian-founded privately owned bookstore chain, that also specialise in CDs, DVDs, Blu-ray discs, e-books and related merchandising. It currently has 65 stores locally and has had several stores in New Zealand and Hong Kong.

History 
The first Dymocks bookstore was opened in Sydney by William Dymock in 1879, in Market Street. As his business grew over the years, he moved to larger premises at 428 George Street, traded as Dymock's Book Arcade, and eventually had a million books in stock. As he had died childless and unmarried, the business passed to his sister, Marjory, who was married to John Forsyth. Since then, the Forsyth family has managed Dymocks. In 1922, the Dymock family purchased the site of the old Royal Hotel in George Street, and built the historic, Art Deco landmark Dymocks building, completed in 1930. In 1986 the bookstore chain was established as a franchise chain, and has since opened stores in every mainland Australian state, and also internationally in New Zealand and Singapore.

In 1999, Dymocks Booksellers entered into a joint venture with South China Morning Post (Holdings) to set up Dymocks Franchise Systems (China), in order to expand the Dymocks chain into Hong Kong.

Hong Kong
The first store with the Dymocks brand opened at the Star Ferry concourse in Central in 1999. Three Dymocks stores closed in 2012 in Hong Kong when their rental contracts expired.

It was announced in January 2015 that Dymocks would close its flagship IFC MALL store on 25 January, and that it would subsequently close its Hong Kong office. After the closure of the IFC Mall store, the number of Dymocks stores in Hong Kong would be brought down to five. The remaining stores are expected to operate independently using the Dymocks name before being rebranded individually.

Dymocks in the 21st century
In addition to stocking music CDs, DVDs and other related items, Dymocks now has an online store launched in late 2006 in response to the increasing penetration into the Australian book market of online retailers such as Amazon.

Dymocks has a comprehensive multi-channel strategy including an international retail network of approximately 65 stores in Australia: an online website, loyalty program, regular catalogues and social media. Dymocks also runs an Australia-wide program, Dymocks Children's Charities (DCC), providing books to pre-primary and primary school age children.

Dymocks is the largest bookseller in Australia and currently holds close to 20% of the Australian book market.

In 2009, Dymocks acquired an 80% equity stake in the Australian owned and operated Healthy Habits sandwich bar franchise for an undisclosed sum. The New Zealand outlets were all closed down by September 2012 as they chose to exit that market.

In 2015, Dymocks Holdings PTY LTD acquired Telegram Paper Goods. Founded in 2008, Telegram Paper Goods distributes designer stationery brands across Australia and New Zealand. Telegram is best known for its online stationery store, Milligram (formerly Notemaker.com.au), that sells eclectic and designer stationery, cards, wrap, diaries, journals, and fine writing instruments.

Loyalty program 

Dymocks has a loyalty program called 'Dymocks Booklover Rewards', originally launched in 2001, and relaunched in 2006.

See also

 List of companies of Australia
 List of oldest companies in Australia

References

External links 

Dymocks Booksellers main Australian page
Dymocks history

Bookshops of Australia
Bookshops of Hong Kong
Retail companies established in 1879
Australian companies established in 1879
Book publishing companies of Australia